Timothy Cecil Groves (born February 18, 1959) is a former American football defensive back and quarterback who played two seasons in the USFL. He went to college at Florida.

Early life and education
Tim Groves was born on February 18, 1959, in Sumter, South Carolina. He went to Oak Ridge High School in Orlando, Florida. Groves went to college at Florida. He played cornerback and quarterback. In 1980, Groves was in a famous play known as "Run, Lindsay!", Groves was a cornerback trying to chase down Lindsay Scott to stop him from scoring a 93-yard game-winning touchdown.

Professional career
Groves started his professional career in 1983, with the Tampa Bay Bandits of the USFL. He played in 11 games with them. The next season he played with the Memphis Showboats.

Later life
After his USFL career, Groves opened a sports bar called "The Thirsty Gator".

References

Living people
1959 births
Florida Gators football players
Tampa Bay Bandits players
Memphis Showboats players
American football quarterbacks
American football defensive backs